Heinz Neumeyer is a German amateur historian. He specializes in the history of Pomerania and Prussia.

He is associated with the League of Expellees. His views on Polish-German relations have been criticized as biased; for example he claimed that Poland was more responsible than Nazi Germany for starting World War II. Edmund Spevack, a Harvard lecturer on history and literature noted in East European Quarterly that Neumayer represents at best a trend of amateurish German nationalistic writing, and at worst fits in tradition of biased, emotion-driven Nazi-era historiography, and does not deserve to be seen as a reliable scholar. Similarly, Karin Friedrich in The Slavonic and East European Review said that Neumeyer's writing is too emotional for a scholar, uses "the language of national prejudice and anachronistic references", and contains numerous factual errors.

Works
Die staatsrechtliche Stellung Westpreussens zur Zeit der "polnischen Oberhoheit" (1454-1772), 1953
Westpreussen ein Blick auf seine Geschichte, 1955
Der Kreis Stuhm, Westpreussen ein Blick auf seine Geschichte, 1958
Danzig : ein Blick auf seine Geschichte, 1961
Westpreussen : ein deutsches Land, 1963
Für einen besseren Frieden Mitarbeiterkongress 1965, 1965
Bibliographie zur Kirchengeschichte von Danzig und Westpreussen, 1967
Aus dem Kirchenleben Westpreussens, 1971
Kirchengeschichte von Danzig und Westpreussen in evangelischer Sicht, 1971
Namenregister zum Teil B. Westpreußen des "Altpreußischen evangelischen Pfarrerbuches" von Friedwald Moeller unter Berücksichtigung der von Arnold Golon 1978 verfaßten "Erläuterungen", 1986
Westpreussen : Geschichte und Schicksal, 1993

References

20th-century German historians
German male non-fiction writers